The Landlord and Tenant Act 1954 (2 & 3 Eliz 2 c 56)  is an act of the United Kingdom Parliament extending to England and Wales. Part II of the act is a statutory code governing business tenancies. Part I of the act, which deals with the protection of residential tenancies, is now largely superseded.

Part II of the act gives business tenants a degree of security of tenure. A business tenant protected by the act may not be evicted simply by the giving of notice to quit or by the ending of a fixed term of the tenancy. The landlord must serve a notice on the tenant, stating which of the seven grounds of opposition they wish to rely upon to oppose a new tenancy.

Applicability 
Part II of the Act applies to any tenancy where the property "is or includes premises which are occupied by the tenant and are so occupied for the purposes of a business carried on by him or for those and other purposes".

There are some exceptions from the Act. These are included in S.43. These include mining leases and agricultural premises. The Act doesn't protect leases under a period of 6 months which hold no scope to renew. Both parties can agree not to be covered. Additionally, a tenancy granted by reason of employment by the grantor is excluded from the Act - providing that there is clear agreement in writing which states the purpose of the tenancy

In Graysim Holdings Ltd v P.&O. Property Holdings Ltd the House of Lords considered the situation of a lease of a market hall to a tenant who then let individual market stalls to market traders. The questions was, whether the tenant could take advantage of the protection offered by the act. The House of Lords decided that the tenant could not be said to occupy for the purposes of the business that was being carried on there (which was being carried out by the market traders).

This decision was followed in Bassairi Limited v London Borough of Camden, where the tenant let out the bulk of the premises as furnished apartments. Again, it was held that the tenant did not occupy for the purposes of a business.

See also
English land law
Rent regulation
Rent regulation in England and Wales

References

External links

 from the Office of Public Sector Information  

United Kingdom Acts of Parliament 1954
English property law
Landlord–tenant law